The South Thompson River is the southern branch of the Thompson River, the largest tributary of the Fraser River, in the Canadian province of British Columbia.

Highway 1, the Trans-Canada Highway, and the mainline of the Canadian Pacific Railway parallel the river. Little Shuswap Lake is fed by the Little River, which drains Shuswap Lake, which is fed by several rivers and creeks.

Before 1982 the river was considered to start at the outlet of Shuswap Lake rather than Little Shuswap Lake, but the short river between Shuswap Lake and Little Shuswap Lake was officially renamed Little River in keeping with long-established local usage.

The South Thompson's main tributaries are Chase Creek, which joins from the south at Chase, Niskonlith Creek, which joins from the north near Niskonlith Lake Provincial Park, Monte Creek, which joins from the south at Monte Creek, and Campbell Creek, which joins from the south.

Geology and vegetation
During the Late Pleistocene, the drainage of the glacial lakes formed the floodplain flanked by deeply carved terraces along both sides of the valley. This glacial recession occurred 11,000 to 11,500 years ago. During the Holocene Climate Optimum (HCO), the postglacial vegetation changed markedly as warmer and dryer conditions replaced cool and moist ones. Douglas fir, grasses and sagebrush increased, while pine declined. Then, a period of cooler and wetter conditions gave way to the modern climate about 4,500 years ago.

See also
 List of tributaries of the Fraser River

References

External links

Thompson Country
Rivers of British Columbia
Tributaries of the Fraser River
Kamloops Division Yale Land District